is a private university in Adachi, Tokyo, Japan, established in 2006.

External links
 Official website 
 Official website 

Educational institutions established in 2006
Private universities and colleges in Japan
Universities and colleges in Tokyo
2006 establishments in Japan